Uranium fluoride can refer to:

 Uranium trifluoride, UF3
 Uranium tetrafluoride, UF4
 Uranium pentafluoride, UF5
 Uranium hexafluoride, UF6
 Tetrauranium heptadecafluoride, U4F17
 Tetrauranium octadecafluoride, U4F18

See also
Uranyl fluoride, UO2F2